Lesley McNaught-Mändli (born 10 February 1964) grew up on the family farm in Hinckley, Leicestershire. She began training with Ted Edgar, a successful international show jumper. In 1981 she became a Junior European Champion with her horse One More Time IV, after winning at Aarau, Switzerland.

At the age of 18 she emigrated to Switzerland, where she got a job working for Willi Melliger at his stables near Neuendorf. It was whilst living in Switzerland that Lesley met and married Markus Mandlii, a Swiss show jumper. Riding for Switzerland, Lesley won a silver medal in show jumping at the 2000 Summer Olympics in Sydney.

References

1964 births
Living people
Olympic equestrians of Switzerland
Swiss female equestrians
Olympic silver medalists for Switzerland
Equestrians at the 1992 Summer Olympics
Equestrians at the 2000 Summer Olympics
Olympic medalists in equestrian
Medalists at the 2000 Summer Olympics